Železno is a small settlement northwest of Dobrnič in the Municipality of Trebnje in eastern Slovenia. The area is part of the historical Lower Carniola region and is included in the Southeast Slovenia Statistical Region.

References

External links
Železno at Geopedia

Populated places in the Municipality of Trebnje